The Battle of Ekau was a battle of the initial phase of the French invasion of Russia. Napoleon's troops from the X Corps of Marshal MacDonald, who had the advantage, defeated the troops of Alexander I defending under the command of General Löwis.

Prelude
On the morning of 18 July, General Löwis, commander of the Russian forces in Mitau, received news of the occupation of Bauska by the 27th Prussian Division of General Grawert. General Löwis, aiming to prevent the movement of the Napoleonic armada to Riga, took the position at the castle of Ekau. In turn, General Grawert made known to General Kleist, who was with his forces to the east, about the impending case. Emperor Alexander I, who was all the time at the 1st Western army, together with his retinue left for St. Petersburg on the night of 19 July.

Battle
On the morning of 19 July, General Grawert began an artillery attack. Then he sent Westphalian cuirassiers to attack Russian positions. The situation remained stable until the evening, when the approaching troops of General Kleist struck on the positions of Löwis from the east. This decided the outcome of the case.

Aftermath
The strategic importance of the battle was reduced to the fact that the selected troops of Löwis, intended to protect Riga, were defeated. This forced the Russian forces to leave the entire left bank of the Western Dvina and, as a preventive measure, to burn the Mitau suburb of Riga.

Legacy
In connection with the 195th anniversary of the battle, the military historical clubs of Latvia, Russia, Poland and Lithuania conducted a costumed staging of the battle. In 2012, to the 200th anniversary of the battle, the Latvian Public Jubilee Committee commemorating the Patriotic War of 1812 in Riga published the book by Oleg Pukhlyak "The Battle of Gross Ekau".

See also 
Siege of Riga (1812)
List of battles of the French invasion of Russia

Notes

References

External links
 

Battles of the French invasion of Russia
Battles of the Napoleonic Wars
Battles involving France
Battles involving Russia
1812 in the Russian Empire
1812 in Latvia
July 1812 events
Battles in Latvia
Courland Governorate